Porfiry is a given name in Russian and other Slavic languages, derived from the Greek Porphyry (porphyrios "purple-clad"). It can refer to:

People
 Porfiry Ivanov (1898–1983), Russian mystic
 Porfiry Krylov (painter) (1902-?), a Soviet painter and graphic artist
 Porfiry Krylov (botanist) (1850–1931), a Soviet botanist
 Porphyrius Uspensky (1804–1885), Russian traveller and theologian

Literature
 Porfiry Petrovich, a detective in Crime and Punishment

See also
 Porphyry (disambiguation)
 Porfirio (similar Spanish name)